Ella Harper (January 5, 1870 – December 19, 1921), known professionally as The Camel Girl, was born with a very rare orthopedic condition that caused her knees to bend backwards, called congenital genu recurvatum. Her preference to walk on all fours resulted in her nickname "Camel Girl". In 1886 she was featured as the star in W. H. Harris's Nickel Plate Circus, appearing in newspapers wherever the circus visited. The back of her pitch card reads:

Harper received a $200 per week salary that likely opened new doors for her.

She is buried in Nashville, Tennessee's Spring Hill Cemetery.

References

External links
 

1870 births
American people with disabilities
1921 deaths
Deaths from colorectal cancer
Sideshow performers
Burials in Tennessee